The Avengers: United They Stand (also known simply as The Avengers) is an animated series based on the Marvel Comics superhero team Avengers. It consists of 13 episodes, which originally premiered on October 30, 1999, and was produced by Avi Arad. It was canceled on February 26, 2000.

The series features two founding members of the team, Ant-Man and the Wasp, and introduces Wonder Man, Tigra, Hawkeye, Falcon, Vision and Scarlet Witch.

Plot
The series features a team broadly based on the roster for the 1984 Avengers spin-off series, the West Coast Avengers, composed of the Wasp, Wonder Man, Tigra, Hawkeye and Scarlet Witch (Hawkeye and Scarlet Witch were also both in the Iron Man animated series as members of Force Works) led by Ant-Man/Giant-Man, with the Falcon and Vision joining in the opening two-parter. For undetermined reasons (perhaps due to their rights being tied up in planned movie projects), the Avengers' "Big Three" were not regular fixtures in the series – Captain America and Iron Man made only guest appearances in one episode each, while Thor did not appear outside of the opening titles (though he was intended to make an appearance in a future season if the show was renewed). Captain America appears in one episode "Command Decision". The story involves the Masters of Evil and a flashback to Captain America defeating Baron Zemo. Meanwhile, Iron Man in the episode "Shooting Stars", helps the Avengers thwart the Zodiac's plan to send a radioactive satellite crashing to Earth.

The series features many of the Avengers' major comic book foes, including Ultron, Kang the Conqueror, Egghead, the Masters of Evil (consisting of Baron Helmut Zemo, Tiger Shark, Absorbing Man, Moonstone, Whirlwind, Boomerang, Cardinal, and Dragonfly) the Grim Reaper (this version wore full body armor and a helmet featuring a skull-like paint job and a scythe-like weapon on his armor; his ties to Wonder Man remained intact) and the Zodiac, as well as associated characters the Swordsman, the Circus of Crime, Namor, Attuma, Agatha Harkness, and the Salem's Seven.

The show made several fan-friendly references to aspects of the characters' comic book history that were otherwise not expanded upon for the uninitiated; such as Falcon and Captain America's partnership, Hawkeye's partial deafness, or Namor's half-breed nature. Beyond this, the series bore little in the way of similarity to the comics, mainly due to its wholesale redesign of the cast, characterized by asymmetrical costume design and the most infamous element of the series – Ant-Man, Wasp, Hawkeye and Falcon all wore suits of battle armor. Also in this incarnation, Tigra is an athlete who underwent genetic treatments to give her a competitive edge. These treatments went awry, leaving her with the form and abilities of a tiger.

Cast

 Linda Ballantyne as Janet Van Dyne / Wasp
 Tony Daniels as Clint Barton / Hawkeye, Aries, Aquarius, Brutacus
 Graham Harley as Edwin Jarvis
 Ray Landry as Raymond Sikorski
 Carolyn Larson as The Computer
 Stavroula Logothettis as Wanda Maximoff / Scarlet Witch
 Hamish McEwan as Simon Williams / Wonder Man
 Gerry Mendicino as Cornelius Van Lunt / Taurus
 Martin Roach as Samuel "Sam" Wilson / Falcon
 Ron Ruben as Vision
 John Stocker as Ultron
 Rod Wilson as Dr. Hank Pym / Ant-Man / Giant-Man
 Lenore Zann as Greer Grant Nelson / Tigra

Additional voices
 Denis Akiyama as Dr. Chris Johnson (in "Kang")
 Philip Akin as Attuma
 Oliver Becker as Carl "Crusher" Creel / Absorbing Man
 Wayne Best as Scorpio
 Normand Bissonette as Maynard Tiboldt / Ringmaster
 Dan Chameroy as Steve Rogers / Captain America
 Conrad Coates as Remnant Leader (in "Remnants")
 Rob Cowan as Frederick "Fred" Myers / Boomerang
 Carlos Diaz as Todd Arliss / Tiger Shark
 Francis Diakowsky as Tony Stark / Iron Man
 Paul Essiembre as Jacques Duquesne / Swordsman
 Nigel Hamer as Gemini: Male Head
 Ken Kramer as Kang the Conqueror
 Robert Latimer as Elihas Starr / Egghead
 Julie Lemieux as Gemini: Female Head
 Stephen Ouimette as Nicholas Scratch
 Susan Roman as Karla Sofen / Moonstone, Dragonfly
 Tate Roswell as Andrew Wilson (in "Kang")
 Allan Royal as Grim Reaper
 Elizabeth Shepherd as Agatha Harkness
 Phillip Shepherd as Baron Zemo
 Raoul Trujillo as Namor
 Peter Wildman as Donald Clendenon / Cardinal
 Peter Windrem as David Cannon / Whirlwind

Appearing in the comics
Other characters that appeared in the comic but not the show:

 Natalia Romanova / Black Widow No. 2 and 5
 Baron Strucker #2
 HYDRA #2
 Nathan Garrett / Black Knight #4 – Nathan Garrett appears and attempts to steal a device from the organization A.I.M.
 Doctor Doom #4 – He attempted to execute the Avengers and Black Knight.
 A.I.M. #5
 The Collector – He chooses to preserve a good population of Earth as he feels the planet is on the verge of ending. Although the Avengers escape, some citizens on Earth prefer to stay with the Collector.

Production
In 1997, Roland Poindexter, the supervising executive in charge of animated series at Fox Kids Network, approached two X-Men (1992) animated series writers named Robert N. Skir and Marty Isenberg to develop a proposal for an Avengers cartoon. After creating a detailed Bible that included a 13-episode story arc, the network decided a Captain America series would be more suited to its schedule. But before Fox Kids could green light either series, Marvel went into bankruptcy, effectively ending the development process for all its shows. It wasn't until after the publisher's financial woes were resolved in late 1998 that Poindexter revived interest in the Avengers project, using the series bible written by Robert N. Skir and Marty Isenberg; because Skir and Isenberg were already committed to spearhead Beast Machines: Transformers, the network approached former X-Men animated series story editor Eric Lewald and his wife, Julia, to come on board as story editors for the series. In January 1999, Fox finally gave the official go-ahead and Ron Myrick was hired to oversee the show's visual development.

The Avengers roster for the cartoon is loosely based upon the roster for the 1984 Avengers spin-off series The West Coast Avengers. Notably absent from the lineup are the traditional core members: Captain America, Iron Man, and Thor, who were originally prohibited from appearing in the series due to licensing issues. Story editor Eric Lewald has commented on their absence and had said "We want this to be a team of Avengers, instead of making it 'Captain America and the Avengers' or 'Thor and the Avengers. We prefer to have a balanced team of superheroes rather than a superstar on the team." However, Captain America and Iron Man each made one guest appearance (in "Command Decision" and "Shooting Stars", respectively), while Thor did not appear outside of the opening sequence.

The decision to pair Scarlet Witch and Wonder Man up as a couple was based upon the storyline then running in the Avengers comic in which Scarlet Witch resurrects Wonder Man to serve as her protector after an evil sorceress transforms the planet into a medieval world under her control. During their time together, the two fall in love and become a couple.

In the promotional images of the series, and the action figure photos, Hawkeye didn't wear a mask. However, in the series and the final version of the figure, he wore a mask similar to that he wore during the Avengers: The Crossing storyline.

This series was commissioned by Fox in the wake of the success of Batman Beyond (1999). In order to attempt to emulate Batman Beyond, changes were made to the Avengers franchise as the series was set in the future. Myrick explained that they were "setting the series about twenty-five years in the future" and that "New York City will be a mix of future and contemporary looks, sort of the way the city looked in the movie Blade Runner (1982) but not as dark." The Avengers were also featured wearing elaborate armor costumes when they went into battle. Myrick explained, "The armor will give them the capability to go into different environments like extreme heat or cold, or underwater, or outer space, and it'll enhance their abilities." The Avengers also featured an "A" on their costumes that was like a Star Trek comlink, where they could hit it and communicate with each other and the mansion's computer.

Episodes
The following list reflects the correct viewing order of The Avengers: United They Stand episodes, according to Marvel's official site.

Proposed second season
Tentative plans for additional episodes were made that featured Hawkeye's return to the carnival where he grew up as well as an episode exploring how the Scarlet Witch discovered her powers. Plans also included guest appearances by the X-Men, utilizing the Toronto-based cast from the 1990s series as a few of them already worked on this show. Other proposed episode plots include Bruce Banner appearing to help the team when Ant-Man fell ill to gamma radiation exposure during a fight with the villain Egghead, Thor and his brother Loki in a two-part episode (there was even a Thor toy made for the show's line of action figures). However, all plans were scrapped when the show had stopped production.

Home media
On May 21, 2007 Maximum Entertainment released the complete series on Region 2 DVD in the UK. The 2-disc boxset features all 13 episodes of the series.

Merchandise and media

Toys
Toy Biz released a line of action figures for the cartoon series. The figures included Ant-Man, Captain America, Falcon, Hawkeye, Kang, Tigra, Vision, Ultron, Wasp and Wonder Man. Air Glider and Sky Cycle vehicle toys were also produced. In the promotional images of the series, and the action figure photos, Hawkeye didn't wear a mask. However, in the series and the final version of the figure, he wore a mask similar to that he wore during the Avengers: The Crossing storyline.

Comic book

The Avengers: United They Stand comic book series by Ty Templeton and Derec Aucoin was published to accompany the series. Due to low sales it lasted only seven issues.

The first two issues are set before the series premiere, Avengers Assemble, Part 1 & 2. No. 1 has the Avengers injured by an early version of Ultron. This issue was used to explain the armor worn by Hawkeye, Wasp and the Falcon in the series, which uses Pym Particles to reduce the pain caused by injury. It is mentioned by Hawkeye that Hank built his own armor after his legs were broken by Dragon Man, and felt no pain in his legs until he removed the armor. No. 3 takes place after the premiere as the Vision is being interviewed about his membership. He is also briefed on how Wonder Man and Hawkeye joined the team.

The Black Panther would appear in No. 1 and 6–7 of the series. In No. 1 he is among the Avengers who are injured by Ultron. Because of that, he refuses to rejoin the team until Hank steps down from being leader. Captain America appears in #6–7 as well. Quicksilver is mentioned twice in the series. In issue 1, Wanda is shown writing a letter to him. Issue 3 shows him in the flashback alongside Captain America, Hawkeye and Scarlet Witch.

References

External links

 
 Avengers Forever: Animated Avengers Cartoon

 
 

United They Stand
Fox Kids
Fox Broadcasting Company original programming
1999 American television series debuts
2000 American television series endings
1990s American animated television series
2000s American animated television series
1999 Canadian television series debuts
2000 Canadian television series endings
1990s Canadian animated television series
2000s Canadian animated television series
Animated television series based on Marvel Comics
Animated series produced by Marvel Studios
American children's animated action television series
American children's animated adventure television series
American children's animated superhero television series
Anime-influenced Western animated television series
Canadian children's animated action television series
Canadian children's animated adventure television series
Canadian children's animated superhero television series
Television shows based on Marvel Comics
Television series by Saban Entertainment
Works by Len Wein